The United Andhra Pradesh Legislative Assembly election of 1983 was held in January 1983 for all 294 constituencies in United Andhra Pradesh, India. The elections were conducted to elect the government in the state of Andhra Pradesh  for the following five years. The TDP secured a huge majority winning 202 seats. The Indian National Congress secured only 60 seats. The election was held in January 1983 instead of August 1983 as scheduled. 
N. T. Rama Rao was sworn in as the 10th and the first non-Congress Chief Minister of the state on 9 January 1983 with ten cabinet ministers and five ministers of State.

Results

List of Assembly constituencies and winners

References 

State Assembly elections in Andhra Pradesh
1980s in Andhra Pradesh
Andhra Pradesh